Tripterocalyx is a small genus of flowering plants in the four o'clock family, Nyctaginaceae. It contains four species formerly included in the closely related genus Abronia, the sand-verbenas. These plants are native to North America, especially the dry desert southwest of the United States. They bloom in heads of several colorful trumpet-shaped flowers. Sandpuffs or sand-verbenas are common names for plants in this genus.

Species
There are four species in the genus Tripterocalyx:Tripterocalyx carneus – winged sandpuffsTripterocalyx crux-maltae – Kellogg's sand-verbenaTripterocalyx micranthus – small-flowered sand-verbenaTripterocalyx wootonii (sometimes treated as a variety of T. carneus'') – Wooton's sandpuffs

References

Nyctaginaceae
Caryophyllales genera